Whiritoa is a small beach town on the Coromandel Peninsula, New Zealand between Whangamatā and Waihi Beach. It has a permanent population in the low hundreds, which swells to over a thousand during the New Year holiday period.

It has a convenience store, a library and a volunteer fire department. The local Surf lifesaving club has a close relationship with the community of regularly holidaying families.

At the north end of the 1.5 km beach is a small lagoon and past this is a short walk to Waimama bay. The lagoon has a cycle of being blocked by sand then being dug out by the council digger or enthusiastic members of the public. At the south end a short bush walk crosses through privately owned land to a blowhole.

The beach itself is popular for surfers as it often features a roaming sandbar or two. The shore is often quite steep meaning the waves are sometimes breaking directly on the sand making it difficult for casual swimmers.

History 
Whiritoa beach is typical of many beaches along the eastern Coromandel Peninsula, starting its formation around 6,000 to 7,000 years ago.

Early Māori communities removed most of the original coastal forest and dune plants. Farmers then introduced stock to the dune area, disturbing the native sand-binding grasses and causing severe wind erosion. Most of the sand reserves eroded, reducing the height of the dunes and caused sheets of sand to move more than 200 m inland. The sand at Whiritoa Beach was mined for over 50 years; in total more than 180,000 m³ of sand has been removed. Since the 1960s coastal subdivision has covered most of what remains of the sand dune reserves.

Demographics
It is part of the wider Waihi Rural statistical area.

Whiritoa had a population of 216 at the 2018 New Zealand census, an increase of 48 people (28.6%) since the 2013 census, and an increase of 18 people (9.1%) since the 2006 census. There were 96 households, comprising 99 males and 114 females, giving a sex ratio of 0.87 males per female. The median age was 56.4 years (compared with 37.4 years nationally), with 21 people (9.7%) aged under 15 years, 27 (12.5%) aged 15 to 29, 93 (43.1%) aged 30 to 64, and 72 (33.3%) aged 65 or older.

Ethnicities were 87.5% European/Pākehā, 23.6% Māori, 1.4% Pacific peoples, 1.4% Asian, and 1.4% other ethnicities. People may identify with more than one ethnicity.

Although some people chose not to answer the census's question about religious affiliation, 47.2% had no religion, 38.9% were Christian and 1.4% had other religions.

Of those at least 15 years old, 24 (12.3%) people had a bachelor's or higher degree, and 33 (16.9%) people had no formal qualifications. The median income was $24,400, compared with $31,800 nationally. 18 people (9.2%) earned over $70,000 compared to 17.2% nationally. The employment status of those at least 15 was that 60 (30.8%) people were employed full-time, 36 (18.5%) were part-time, and 9 (4.6%) were unemployed.

References

External links 

 Waikato Regional Council case study

Hauraki District
Populated places in Waikato